Yerkebulan Kayratuly Seydakhmet (Erkebūlan Qairatūly Seidahmet; born 4 February 2000) is a Kazakh professional footballer who plays as a winger for Kazakh club FC Kairat and the Kazakhstan national team.

Club career
He made his Kazakhstan Premier League debut for FC Taraz on 1 April 2017 in a game against FC Tobol.

On 12 February 2018, he signed with a Russian Premier League side FC Ufa. He made his debut for Ufa as a second half substitute in a league game against FC Anzhi Makhachkala on 10 March 2018.

On 28 February 2019, Seydakhmet was loaned to Bulgarian club Levski Sofia until the end of the calendar year. However, in mid-June, his loan spell was prematurely terminated after he was deemed surplus to the needs of the team by the new manager Petar Houbchev.

Kairat
On 25 June 2019, FC Kairat announced the signing of Seydakhmet on a three-year contract, with an option of another two, from FC Ufa.

Career statistics

Club

International

Statistics accurate as of match played 16 October 2018

International goals
Scores and results list Kazakhstan's goal tally first.

References

External links
 

2000 births
Living people
Kazakhstani footballers
Kazakhstan international footballers
Kazakhstan youth international footballers
Kazakhstan under-21 international footballers
FC Taraz players
FC Ufa players
PFC Levski Sofia players
FC Kairat players
Kazakhstan Premier League players
Russian Premier League players
First Professional Football League (Bulgaria) players
Kazakhstani expatriate footballers
Expatriate footballers in Russia
Expatriate footballers in Bulgaria
Association football forwards
People from Taraz